This is a list of Australian television events and premieres which occurred, or were scheduled to occur, in 2013, the 58th year of continuous operation of television in Australia.

Events

 17 January – The Seven Network's longest running soap opera Home and Away celebrates its 25th anniversary.
 18 January – The Nine Network's nightly current affairs programme A Current Affair turns 25.
 22 February – Network Ten's CEO, James Warburton, is stood down after 14 months in the role, following a string of network ratings failures.
 21 March – Phil Rankine and Amity Dry win an All-Stars edition of The Block.
 1 April – SBS revamps SBS 2 with an aim on a youth-oriented audience.
 7 April – Asher Keddie wins the Gold Logie Award for Most Popular Personality on Australian Television at the 2013 Logie Awards.
 17 April – The court bans Mel B from appearing on Channel Nine's Australia's Got Talent. Instead she will continue with Channel Seven for an indefinite long run.
 26 April – Days of Our Lives the US soap opera finishes its long 45-year run on the Nine Network, ending a 4-decade tradition of Daytime Soap operas in Australian Free-to-air Television. 6 years later, the program returns to Nine along with The Young and the Restless airing from 2 September on 9Gem
 28 April – Dan and Steph Mulheron win the fourth season of My Kitchen Rules.
 16 May – Cricketer Andrew Symonds wins the first series of Celebrity Splash!.
 29 May – Robyn and Katie Dyke win the eighth season of The Biggest Loser.
 17 June – Harrison Craig wins the second season of The Voice.
 1 July – Carly Schulz and Leighton Brow win the first season of House Rules.
 28 July – Alisa and Lysandra Fraser win the seventh season of The Block.
 27 August – Nancy Ho wins the first series of The Great Australian Bake Off.
 24 September – Melissa Juratowitch wins the eighth cycle of Australia's Next Top Model.
 16 October – Hillal Kara-Ali wins the sixth and final season of The Mole, taking home $180,000 in prize money. Erin Dooley is revealed as the Mole, and Aisha Jefcoate is the runner-up.
 28 October – Dami Im wins the fifth season of The X Factor.
 2 November – Channel Seven again bans Mel B from appearing on Channel Ten's The Project in the last minute before it goes to air.
 6 November – Tim Dormer wins the tenth season of Big Brother.
 10 November – Music trio Uncle Jed win the seventh season of Australia's Got Talent.
 26 November – Illusionist Cosentino and his partner Jessica Raffa win the thirteenth season of Dancing with the Stars.
 10 December – The final analogue signals are turned off in Melbourne and Surrounds as well as Remote Central and Eastern Australia, bringing an end to 57 years of analogue broadcasting in Australia.

Deaths

Channels

New channels
 28 March – eXtra
 17 September – Spree TV 
 22  or 25 November – Fresh Ideas TV

Renamed channels
 1 January – Foxtel Movies (replacing both Showtime and Movie Network)
 2 April – SBS 2 (rename of SBS TWO)

Digital television transition

Analogue switch-off
The switch-off of analogue television was completed in 2013, with the following areas being the last to be switched off:
 2 April – Adelaide
 9 April – Tasmania
 16 April – Perth
 28 May – Brisbane, Gold Coast
 25 June – Regional Western Australia
 28 July – Darwin
 3 December – Sydney
 10 December – Melbourne, Remote Central and Eastern Australia

Restack/Retune
Restack was the official name, and Retune was the more consumer-friendly name, given to the change in frequency of many digital television stations following analog switch-off.  The main purpose was to clear channels 52–69 in the 700 MHz band for reuse in mobile communications.  Channels 9 & 9A were also cleared so that they could be used for DAB+.  Many remote areas were excluded, their stations didn't change frequency and channel 9 & 9A continue to be used in some remote areas for digital television.

The restack began in April 2013 and was completed by the end of 2014.

Premieres

Domestic series

International series

Telemovies

Miniseries

Documentary specials

Specials

Programming changes

Changes to network affiliation 
Criterion for inclusion in the following list is that Australian premiere episodes will air in Australia for the first time on the new network. This includes when a programme is moved from a free-to-air network's primary channel to a digital multi-channel, as well as when a program moves between subscription television channels – provided the preceding criterion is met. Ended television series which change networks for repeat broadcasts are not included in the list.

Free-to-air premieres
This is a list of programs which made their premiere on Australian free-to-air television that had previously premiered on Australian subscription television. Programs may still air on the original subscription television network.

Subscription premieres
This is a list of programs which made their premiere on Australian subscription television that had previously premiered on Australian free-to-air television. Programs may still air on the original free-to-air television network.

Endings

Returning this year

See also
 2013 in Australia
 List of Australian films of 2013

Notes 
The Last Leg was originally scheduled to air on 17 February 2013 before being rescheduled to premiere on 6 February 2013 instead.
Arrow was originally scheduled to air on 16 April 2013 before being rescheduled to premiere on 1 May 2013 instead.
After being removed from the Nine Network's schedule due to poor ratings, Major Crimes began airing on Nine's digital multichannel GEM from 24 June instead.
The pilot episode of Beauty and the Beast originally screened on Network Ten, however—due to poor ratings—subsequent episodes aired on Ten's digital multichannel Eleven instead.
Low Winter Sun was originally scheduled to air on 13 August before being rescheduled to premiere on 27 August instead.
Hostages was originally scheduled to air on 2 October before being rescheduled to premiere on 9 October instead.
Although the Kids' WB block had aired on GO! since the channel's launch in 2009, it had also continued airing episodes on the Nine Network until 31 December 2012. Starting 1 January, the entire children's programming along with Kids' WB began to air solely on GO! due to new fines in the Nine Network Code of Practice.

References